BD+20 2457 is a 10th-magnitude K-type bright giant star located approximately 5,400 light-years away in the constellation of Leo. The name refers to the Bonner Durchmusterung star catalog. This star is very metal-poor, containing only 10% as enriched with elements heavier than hydrogen and helium as the Sun. On June 10, 2009, two planets were announced to be orbiting the star, with minimum masses 21.4 and 12.5 times the mass of Jupiter and orbital periods of 380 and 622 days for the inner and outer planets, respectively. A dynamical analysis reveals that the proposed system is unstable on astronomically short timescales and so the suggested planetary configuration is unlikely to be correct: further data is needed to determine a physically plausible explanation for the radial velocity variations.

References

K-type bright giants
Leo (constellation)
Hypothetical planetary systems
BD+20 2457